Rodrigo Lemunao (born 26 September 1978) is a Chilean former professional footballer who played as a attacking midfielder or forward for clubs in Chile and Indonesia.

Career
A product of Palestino youth system, Lemunao made appearances for the first team in 1997 and 1998.

In Chile, he also played for Fernández Vial, Rangers de Talca, Deportes Copiapó and Provincial Osorno.

Abroad, he played in Indonesia for Persib Bandung in 2003–04, where he coincided with compatriots such as Claudio Lizama, Alejandro Tobar and the coach Juan Páez.

Personal life
Lemunao is of Mapuche descent. His surname means "mountain lion" or "puma".

References

External links
 
 Rodrigo Lemunao at Oocities.org 

1978 births
Living people
Chilean people of Mapuche descent
Footballers from Santiago
Mapuche sportspeople
Chilean footballers
Chilean expatriate footballers
Club Deportivo Palestino footballers
C.D. Arturo Fernández Vial footballers
Rangers de Talca footballers
Persib Bandung players
Deportes Copiapó footballers
Provincial Osorno footballers
Chilean Primera División players
Primera B de Chile players
Liga 2 (Indonesia) players
Chilean expatriate sportspeople in Indonesia
Expatriate footballers in Indonesia
Association football midfielders
Association football forwards
Indigenous sportspeople of the Americas